Centre Island is a village located within the Town of Oyster Bay in Nassau County, on Long Island, in New York, United States. Its population was 410 as of the 2010 census.

Geography 

Despite its name, it is actually a peninsula.

Demographics

As of the census of 2000, there were 444 people, 174 households, and 128 families residing in the village. The population density was 397.2 people per square mile (153.1/km2). There were 209 housing units at an average density of 187.0 per square mile (72.0/km2). The racial makeup of the village was 96.62% White, 0.45% African American, 0.90% Asian, 0.45% from other races, and 1.58% from two or more races. Hispanic or Latino of any race were 3.15% of the population.

There were 174 households, out of which 29.9% had children under the age of 18 living with them, 63.2% were married couples living together, 6.9% had a female householder with no husband present, and 25.9% were non-families. 19.5% of all households were made up of individuals, and 6.3% had someone living alone who was 65 years of age or older. The average household size was 2.55 and the average family size was 2.93.

In the village, the population was spread out, with 20.9% under the age of 18, 3.8% from 18 to 24, 27.7% from 25 to 44, 31.1% from 45 to 64, and 16.4% who were 65 years of age or older. The median age was 43 years. For every 100 females, there were 98.2 males. For every 100 females age 18 and over, there were 105.3 males.

The median income for a household in the village was $117,848, and the median income for a family was $115,972. Males had a median income of $100,000 versus $40,000 for females. The per capita income for the village was $96,674. About 6.0% of families and 12.6% of the population were below the poverty line, including 32.5% of those under age 18 and 5.9% of those age 65 or over.

Government 
As of August 2021, the Mayor of Centre Island is Michael Chalos and the Village Trustees are Robert Broussard, Grace Haggerty, and the Honorable Victor Ort.

Education

School district 
The Village of Centre Island is located entirely within the boundaries of the Oyster Bay–East Norwich Central School District. As such, all children who reside within Centre Island and attend public schools go to Oyster Bay–East Norwich's schools.

Library district 
Centre Island is located within the boundaries of the Oyster Bay–East Norwich Library District.

Notable people
 Sean Hannity: Radio host, television host, political commentator, and author.
 Billy Joel: American singer-songwriter, composer, and pianist.
 Alan Jay Lerner: Academy and Tony Award-winning lyricist.
 Rupert Murdoch: Media mogul who founded NewsCorp.
 Rosalind P. Walter: American philanthropist known for her support of PBS programs.

References

External links 

 Official website

Villages in New York (state)
Oyster Bay (town), New York
Long Island Sound
Villages in Nassau County, New York
Populated coastal places in New York (state)